Typhoon Alice was a typhoon that brought severe flooding to Guam during the latter part of the 1953 Pacific typhoon season. The system was first tracked near the Marshall Islands on October 11 by the Fleet Weather Central (FWC) as a tropical storm, and the Central Meteorological Observatory (CMO) as a tropical depression. The CMO upgraded Alice to a tropical storm east of Guam on October 14. Near Iwo Jima, the typhoon traveled northeastwards, reaching its peak of  late on October 18. Alice then steadily weakened down to a tropical storm on October 20. The storm became extratropical on October 23 near the International Date Line, and both agencies ceased tracking the cyclone.

As the typhoon moved near Guam from October 14 to October 16,  of rain fell within 24 hours, at the time a record for the territory. Villages on the island had homes and businesses flooded, causing thousands of dollars of damage. Several bridges were washed away, causing of three of the deaths. Andersen Air Force Base suffered from flooding, but military installations were not heavily damaged. Damage totals on the island exceed $100,000 (1953 USD). Little damage was reported in Iwo Jima, where Alice moved to the east of the island.

Meteorological history

The Fleet Weather Central (FWC) and the Central Meteorological Observatory (CMO) began tracking a system west of the Marshall Islands at 12:00 UTC on October 11. After October 15, Alice began to travel northwestwards and continued to intensify.

The highest maximum sustained winds, equivalent to a Category 3 typhoon on the Saffir–Simpson scale, were recorded at 18:00 UTC on October 19 near Iwo Jima by the 56th Weather Reconnaissance Squadron. According to an analysis of the historic western north Pacific tropical cyclone record in the Monthly Weather Review, it was likely that stronger winds existed near the eye, but were not observed. The CMO declared the storm to be extratropical six hours later, as it traveled past the IDL.

Preparations and impact
The storm was not expected to strengthen near Guam, and personnel at the Andersen Air Force Base were told to remain in shelter. Reconnaissance flights were not able to take flight from the air force base, and flights were completed from Tokyo instead. Shipping, including reefer ships, to Guam were delayed.

Alice moved slowly to the north of Guam from October 14 to October 16, only moving  during that time, causing significant flooding. During a 48-hour period, Andersen Air Force Base and Naval Air Station Agana received  of rain respectively. The 24-hour rainfall total at Andersen Air Base, was the record high in Guam until Typhoon Pamela of 1976 struck the island. The resulting floods washed away four bridges across the island, cutting off access to the villages of Talofofo, Inarajan, Merizo, and Umatac. Electricity was shut off in areas with flooding issues, and a boil-water advisory was in effect. Multiple roads, including Highways 4 and 8, were rendered impassable, and Marine Drive had debris floating and stalled cars alongside it.

Many homes and businesses across the island were damaged by the floods. Thousands of dollars of merchandise and properties were ruined, causing stores to close down for repairs. Government offices were also closed or on stand-by except public works and the police departments. Water leaked into the Guam Memorial Hospital, prompting doctors and nurses to move patients and supplies to dryer areas. Residents in Yigo, Tamuning, and Asan had floodwaters damage their homes, causing some to evacuate. Much of Andersen Air Force Base was flooded, and two airmen were electrocuted when they were leaning against a metal doorknob at The Airman's Club. Naval installations at the base had minor water damage, and operations returned to normal one day later. Four deaths were reported during the storm. Two of them were airmen attempting to cross the Talofofo River when the bridge washed away. A search party was initiated, but it was later called off as no bodies were found. One of the bodies was found near Dealy Beach and Togcha on October 19. The third casualty was a Filipino firefighter who had also attempted to cross the river, with his body found  from the bridge. The fourth death was a farmer dying from a heart attack in his pasture during the storm; he had been previously reported as drowned. Property damage totals exceeded $100,000. Ford Quint Elvidge, the Governor of Guam, toured the island and inspected the damage, praising the government agencies for their efforts.

See also

Other storms of the same name
Typhoon Hester (1952)

Notes

References

External links
Digital Typhoon: Typhoon 195318 (ALICE)

A
Alice